Vestido Mojado is the seventh full-length album released by the New Mexico musician Al Hurricane in 1974.

Track listing

References

Al Hurricane albums
New Mexico music albums